Phantom Stallion is a 1954 American Western film directed by Harry Keller and starring Rex Allen, Carla Balenda and Slim Pickens. The film is credited as being the last singing cowboy Western.

The film's art direction was by Frank Arrigo.

Plot

Cast
 Rex Allen as Rex Allen  
 Koko as Rex's Horse  
 Slim Pickens as Slim  
 Carla Balenda as Claire  
 Harry Shannon as Michael Reilly  
 Don Haggerty as Foreman Gil  
 Peter Price as Tony Reilly  
 Rosa Turich as Lucretia  
 Zon Murray as Henchman 
 Charles La Torre as Escobar 
 Rocky Shahan as Henchman

References

Bibliography
 Pitts, Michael R. Western Movies: A Guide to 5,105 Feature Films. McFarland, 2012.

External links
 

1954 films
1954 Western (genre) films
American Western (genre) films
Films directed by Harry Keller
Republic Pictures films
Films about horses
American black-and-white films
1950s English-language films
1950s American films